Charles Hennuyer (7 February 1895 – 11 November 1958) was a French racing cyclist. He rode in the 1921 Tour de France.

References

1895 births
1958 deaths
French male cyclists
Place of birth missing